Andre Agassi was the defending champion, but did not participate this year.

Brad Gilbert won the title, defeating Jason Stoltenberg 6–4, 6–4 in the final.

Seeds

Draw

Finals

Top half

Bottom half

External links
 Main draw

Singles